Victoriano Damián Sosa (born April 17, 1974 in La Vega, Dominican Republic) is a boxer.

Personal 
Sosa is second cousin of Major League Baseball player Sammy Sosa.

Amateur career
Member of the 1992 Dominican Olympic Team as a Featherweight. His results were:
Defeated by Anand Kumar Ray (India) 23-14
Defeated Steven Chungu (Zambia) 11-9
Lost to Hocine Soltani (Algeria) 13-4

Pro career 
His career boxing record is 42-4-2- (31 KOs). Earlier in his career, Sosa won minor titles—the WBC Fecarbox and Dominican Republic lightweight titles. He has been a contender in the lightweight division, challenging world champions such as Floyd Mayweather Jr. and Miguel Cotto (going the distance and getting KOed respectively), as well as Paul Spadafora.

Professional boxing record

References

External links 
 

1974 births
Lightweight boxers
Living people
People from La Vega Province
Boxers at the 1992 Summer Olympics
Olympic boxers of the Dominican Republic
Dominican Republic male boxers